Raphael Oliveira may refer to:
Raphael Vieira de Oliveira (born 1979), Brazilian volleyball player
Raphael Oliveira (athlete) Brazilian sprinter, competed at the 2000 Summer Olympics